The court ranks of Japan, also known in Japanese as ikai (位階), are indications of an individual's court rank in Japan based on the system of the state. Ikai as a system was originally used in the Ritsuryo system, which was the political administration system used in ancient China, and the indication of the rank of bureaucrats and officials in countries that inherited (class system).

Currently, the Japanese court ranks and titles are now one of the types of honours conferred to those who have held government posts for a long time and to those who have made distinguished achievements. In recent times, most appointments, if not all, are offered posthumously. A recent recipient of such a court rank is the late former prime minister Shinzo Abe on 8 July 2022, who received Junior First Rank (従一位, ju ichi-i).

Court ranks

Upper ranks

Fourth Rank

Fifth Rank

Sixth Rank

Seventh Rank

Eighth Rank

Initial Rank

Court positions

Hereditary titles

References

Court ranks